The first seeds Daphne Akhurst and Esna Boyd defeated the fourth seeds Kathleen Le Messurier and Dorothy Weston 6–3, 6–1 in the final, to win the women's doubles tennis title at the 1928 Australian Championships.

Seeds

  Daphne Akhurst /  Esna Boyd (champions)
  Louie Bickerton /  Meryl O'Hara Wood (semifinals)
  Marjorie Cox /  Sylvia Harper (semifinals)
  Kathleen Le Messurier /  Dorothy Weston (final)

Draw

Draw

Notes

 These ladies switched pairs in relation to an original draw.
 Most likely Flora Rowe, mother of Ernest Rowe.

References

External links
Source for seedings
Source for the draw

1928 in Australian tennis
1928 in women's tennis
1928 in Australian women's sport
Women's Doubles